Tunari is a mountain in the Tunari mountain range of the Bolivian Andes, about  high. It is situated in the Cochabamba Department, Quillacollo Province, Quillacollo Municipality, northwest of Quillacollo. Tunari lies southeast of Wayna Tunari.

See also 
 Jatun Q'asa
 Puma Apachita

References 

Mountains of Cochabamba Department